is a former Japanese voice actress affiliated with 81 Produce. On March 1, 2017, she announced her retirement from voice acting.

Voice roles
Bold denotes leading roles.

Anime
2009
Element Hunters as Hannah Weber
Nyan Koi! as Eiko Oota (ep 1–2, 7)
Tokyo Magnitude 8.0 as Volunteer

2010
Dance in the Vampire Bund as Yumi

2011
Blood-C as Female student (ep 8–9)
Chibi Devi! as Natsuki Takayama 
Freezing as Tris McKenzie
Kamisama Dolls as Yurako Somaki
Kore wa Zombie Desu ka? as Nurse (ep 5), Taeko Hiramatsu (she also did the ending theme, released as a single with a cover of Yuki Saito's Sotsugyō)
Morita-san wa Mukuchi as Maki-sensei
Sacred Seven as Ageha Yamaguchi

2012
Kore wa Zombie Desu ka? of the Dead as Taeko Hiramatsu
Saki Achiga-hen episode of Side-A as Shiori Mizumura

Video Games
School of Talent: SUZU-ROUTE as Suzu Yuki

References

External links

Japanese voice actresses
1986 births
Living people
Voice actresses from Nara Prefecture
81 Produce voice actors